Ischionodonta smaragdina is a species of beetle in the family Cerambycidae. It was described by Martins and Napp in 1989. It is found in Brazil.

References

Ischionodonta
Beetles described in 1989